Peter Beaumont (born July 24, 2001) is an English ice dancer, who competes internationally for Canada. With his skating partner, Nadiia Bashynska, he is a two-time World Junior bronze medalist (2022, 2023), 2022–23 Junior Grand Prix Final champion, a four-time ISU Junior Grand Prix medallist, and the 2023 Canadian Junior champion.

Beaumont formerly skated for Great Britain with partner Mia Jowitt, and was the 2015 British novice ice dance champion.

Personal life 
Beaumont was born in Rotherham, England.

Skating career

Early career
After starting to learn to skate in 2009, Beaumont competed in the United Kingdom as both a singles skater and an ice dancer. In singles, he won the silver medal at the 2015 British Novice Championships. His first ice dance partnership was with Mia Jowitt, and together they won the 2015 British novice title, and the bronze medal at the 2016 British Junior Championships. Jowitt/Beaumont ended their partnership in the 2016–17 season.

Beaumont moved to train in Toronto under coaches Carol and Jon Lane and Juris Razgulajevs. He began skating with Ukrainian-Canadian dancer Nadiia Bashynska in June 2017, representing Canada.

2017–18 season: Debut of Bashynska/Beaumont
Bashynska and Beaumont began competing together domestically, winning the silver medal at the 2018 Skate Canada Challenge's novice division. This qualified them to the 2022 Canadian Novice Championships, where they won the gold medal. Based on this, they were given their first international assignment to the advanced novice competition at the Egna Trophy in Val Gardena. Third after the short dance, they rose to second overall in the free dance. Beaumont said that they were both "really thankful for the opportunity to skate abroad."

2018–19 season: JGP debut
Moving up to the junior level, Bashynska/Beaumont were fifth at the Lake Placid Ice Dance International in New York. They were assigned to make their Junior Grand Prix debut at the 2018 JGP Slovakia in Bratislava. Placing ninth in the rhythm dance, they were fifth in the free dance despite an audience member throwing a stuffed toy onto the ice midway through the program, requiring them to adjust where they were going. They remained ninth overall.

Thirteenth at Skate Canada Challenge, they finished the season competing at the 2019 Canadian Junior Championships, where they were tenth.

2019–20 season: First JGP medal
Bashynska/Beaumont returned to Lake Placid Ice Dance International to start the season, winning the gold medal. They were assigned to two events on the Junior Grand Prix, beginning with the 2019 JGP Russia in Chelyabinsk. They set personal bests in all three programs, finishing third in the rhythm dance, fifth in the free dance, and taking the bronze medal overall. Bashysnka and Beaumont were the only non-Russian medallists in any discipline in Chelyabinsk. Bashynska noted that the well-attended Russian event was the largest audience they had ever performed in front of. They were fourth at their second event, the 2019 JGP Croatia.

Winning silver medals at both Skate Canada Challenge and the 2020 Canadian Junior Championships, Bashynska Beaumont were next assigned to the Bavarian Open along with the other three top Canadian junior dance teams to determine which would attend the 2020 World Junior Championships. They performed poorly at the event, finishing ninth overall and last among the Canadian teams, and as such their season concluded.

2020–21 season
With the COVID-19 pandemic severely constraining competitions, both the ISU Junior Grand Prix and the 2021 World Junior Championships were cancelled.  As well, in-person domestic competition was limited, as a result of which Bashynska/Beaumont competed only once during the season, at a virtually-held 2021 Skate Canada Challenge. They won the bronze medal. The 2021 Canadian Junior Championships were subsequently cancelled.

2021–22 season: World Junior bronze
With the resumption of the Junior Grand Prix, Bashynska/Beaumont returned to international competition at the 2021 JGP Russia in Krasnoyarsk. They finished fourth, less than three points back of third. Bashynska said that they were satisfied with their performance overall, but needed to address some technical issues. Weeks later at their second event, the 2021 JGP Austria in Linz, they initially placed fourth in the rhythm dance. Third in the free dance, they rose to third overall to win their second JGP bronze medal. Beaumont said that going into the free dance they "had the mindset that we've moved up in the standings before and we can do it again."

Bashynska/Beaumont won the gold medal at the 2021 Skate Canada Challenge. Entering the 2022 Canadian Junior Championships in Ottawa, they were second in both programs to take their second consecutive national silver medal.

Due to the pandemic, the 2022 World Junior Championships could not be held as scheduled in Sofia in early March, and as a result were rescheduled for Tallinn in mid-April. The event was further upended when Bashynska's birth country of Ukraine was invaded by Russia. Bashynska and Beaumont's free program for the season had been a medley of Russian folk songs, including the military-themed "Katyusha", which Bashynska would later say "was very close to me" as she felt "it unites our two Nations to show nothing but love." In light of the invasion, she said "now I don't think I'll be able to forgive or ever compare these two countries ever again. I'm Ukrainian and will always be." The team revived their previous seasons' free dance to "Caruso" and "And the Waltz Goes On" for the rest of the season.

As a result of the invasion, the International Skating Union banned all Russian and Belarusian athletes from participating in competitions, which had a significant impact on the junior dance field. The North American dance teams were viewed as favourites to dominate the podium, though Bashynska/Beaumont were not considered among the very top contenders going in compared to their compatriots D'Alessandro/Waddell and Americans Wolfkostin/Chen and Brown/Brown. In the rhythm dance, they scored 63.45 points, finishing narrowly in third place, 0.15 points behind D'Alessandro/Waddell in second, while the Browns were solidly in first place with 66.98. Wolfkostin/Chen were distantly in ninth after she fell on her twizzle sequence. Beaumont said that "coming to this competition, we didn't have any expectations as a team. We just wanted to enjoy it and let our skating speak for itself." In the free dance they lost points when their rotational lift was graded as only level 1, placing fifth in that segment, but remained in third place overall, 0.37 points ahead of Wolfkostin/Chen. They won the bronze medal, saying they were "overjoyed" with the result.

2022–23 season: JGP Final gold
Bashynska and Beaumount were initially scheduled to begin their final junior season at the Armenian stop on the Junior Grand Prix circuit. However, when that was cancelled as a result of the September conflict between Azerbaijan and Armenia, they were reassigned elsewhere. Instead, their first event was the first of two Polish Junior Grand Prixes held in Gdańsk.  They won the gold medal there, setting three new personal best scores. Bashynska commented on the delay, saying "we're pretty lucky that we motivate each other every day. So even when we found out about the cancellation we were able  to push through and keep sharp for this competition."  Competing at the second Polish event the following weekend, they won their second gold medal, improving their rhythm dance and total scores and securing qualification to the Junior Grand Prix Final.

At the Junior Grand Prix Final in Torino, Bashynska/Beaumont finished first in the rhythm dance after pre-event favourites Mrázková/Mrázek of the Czech Republic had a double-fall in their Argentine tango pattern dance. They won the free dance as well, taking the gold medal and becoming the first Canadian dancers to medal at the event since Tessa Virtue and Scott Moir in 2005. Bashynska remarked that "we were aiming to win obviously, but actually winning is like 'Oh my gosh' I don't know how else to describe. It feels surreal." Both noted that the World Junior Championships were being held in Calgary at the end of the season, saying they were looking forward to trying to win that title on home soil. Their training mates Piper Gilles and Paul Poirier won gold in the senior Grand Prix Final on the same day.

Heavy favourites for the national title going in, they broke Lajoie/Lagha's national junior records at the 2023 Canadian Junior Championships and took the gold medal. They were subsequently named to compete at the 2023 World Junior Championships.

At the World Junior Championships in Calgary, Bashynska/Beaumont entered as one of the title favourites based on their season to date, but encountered problems in the rhythm dance, stumbling in the first pattern segment, on which they received only a level 1. They earned a level 2 on the second set. As a result, they finished fourth in the segment, 0.89 points behind third-place Britons Bekker/Hernandez. They skated more cleanly in the free dance, albeit with Beaumont losing a twizzle level, but rose to third place in the segment and were narrowly third overall by 0.06 points, after Bekker/Hernandez took a one-point deduction for an extended lift. They earned their second Junior World bronze. On the subject of the move to the senior level, Bashynska said they were "looking forward to showing a new side of ourselves, obviously stepping up our game."

Programs

Competitive highlights 
JGP: Junior Grand Prix

With Bashynska for Canada

With Jowitt for Great Britain

Men's singles

Detailed results 
ISU Personal Bests highlighted in bold.

With Bashynska

References

External links 
 
 Rink Results: Nadiia Bashynska / Peter Beaumont
 Stats on Ice: Mia Jowitt / Peter Beaumont
 Stats on Ice: Peter Beaumont

2001 births
Living people
English male ice dancers
Sportspeople from Rotherham
English emigrants to Canada
World Junior Figure Skating Championships medalists